Quock Walker, also known as Kwaku or Quork Walker (1753 – ?), was an American slave who sued for and won his freedom suit case in June 1781. The court cited language in the new Massachusetts Constitution (1780) that declared all men to be born free and equal. The case is credited with helping abolish slavery in Massachusetts, although the 1780 constitution was never amended to explicitly prohibit the practice. Massachusetts was the first state of the union to effectively and fully abolish slavery. By the 1790 federal census, no slaves were recorded in the state.

Early life
Quock Walker was born in Massachusetts in 1753 to slaves Mingo and Dinah, who were believed to be of Ghanaian origin. He is believed to have been named Kwaku, Akan for "boy born on Wednesday", a traditional day-naming practice among the Akan people. The following year, the entire family was bought by James Caldwell, of the prominent Caldwell family of Worcester County. Quock was promised his freedom at the age of 25 by Caldwell. Caldwell died when Quock was 10 years old, but his widow renewed the promise, agreeing to give him his freedom at the age of 21. The widowed Mrs. Caldwell married Nathaniel Jennison in 1769 and died about 1772, when Walker was 19.

Quock Walker's siblings born in Barre, Massachusetts, (then Rutland, MA): Cato Walker (1754–?), Minor Walker (1758–1852), Stephen (Step) Walker (1759–1845), Priscilla Walker (1767–), Rosanna (Rose) Annis Walker (1771–1860), Esther Walker (1772–?), eventually became part of the Commonwealth v. Jennison lawsuit.

When the time came for Walker's promised manumission, Jennison felt completely unbound by his late wife's promise and refused to let him go. In 1781, Walker, then aged 28, ran away. He went to work at a nearby farm belonging to Seth and John Caldwell, brothers of his former master. Jennison retrieved him and beat him severely as punishment. Soon after, Walker sued Jennison for battery, and Jennison sued the Caldwells for enticing Walker away from him.

Background
By the mid-18th century, enslavement of Africans had become common practice in Massachusetts. A 1754 census listed nearly 4500 slaves in the colony. Abolitionist sentiment had been growing, especially as the philosophical underpinnings of independence and democracy became common parlance in the colony. While Massachusetts had derived wealth from the Trans-Atlantic Slave Trade, its merchant and mixed economy was not dependent on slave labor to the extent of southern states. In 1781 Elizabeth Freeman, an enslaved woman also known as Mum Bett, sued for freedom and won in county court, based on her claim that slavery was not consistent with the state constitution's statement declaring that "all men are born free and equal." Her case was cited in the state court in Quock Walker, below.

Cases
In 1780, Judge John Lowell was a delegate to the state constitutional convention. As such, he is credited with being the author of the clause in the Massachusetts state constitution that declared “all men are born free and equal.”

There were three trials related to these events, two civil and one criminal. These took place during the American Revolutionary War, when language about the equality of people was in the air and after the new Massachusetts constitution had been passed in 1780. The civil cases were : Jennison v. Caldwell (for "deprivation of the benefit of his servant, Walker"), apparently heard and decided first; and Quock Walker v. Jennison (for assault and battery). Both cases were heard by the Worcester County Court of Common Pleas on June 12, 1781.

In the first case, Jennison argued that Caldwell had enticed away his employee Walker. The court found in Jennison's favor and awarded him 25 pounds. The Walker case was opened by the plaintiff's attorney considering the question of whether a previous master's promise to free Walker gave him a right to freedom after the master previously making the promise had died prior to its fulfillment. Walker's lawyers argued that the concept of slavery was contrary to the Bible and the new Massachusetts Constitution (1780). The jury voted that Walker was a free man under the constitution and awarded him 50 pounds in damages.

Both decisions were appealed. Jennison's appeal of Walker's freedom was tossed out in September 1781 by the Massachusetts Supreme Judicial Court, either because he failed to appear or because his lawyers did not submit the required court papers. The Caldwells won the other appeal; a jury concurred that Walker was a free man, and therefore the defendants were entitled to employ him and owed his prior employer no damages.

In September 1781, a third case was filed by the Attorney General against Jennison, Commonwealth v. Jennison, for criminal assault and battery of Walker. In his charge to the jury, Chief Justice William Cushing stated:

As to the doctrine of slavery and the right of Christians to hold Africans in perpetual servitude, and sell and treat them as we do our horses and cattle, that (it is true) has been heretofore countenanced by the Province Laws formerly, but nowhere is it expressly enacted or established. It has been a usage – a usage which took its origin from the practice of some of the European nations, and the regulations of British government respecting the then Colonies, for the benefit of trade and wealth. But whatever sentiments have formerly prevailed in this particular or slid in upon us by the example of others, a different idea has taken place with the people of America, more favorable to the natural rights of mankind, and to that natural, innate desire of Liberty, with which Heaven (without regard to color, complexion, or shape of noses-features) has inspired all the human race. And upon this ground our Constitution of Government, by which the people of this Commonwealth have solemnly bound themselves, sets out with declaring that all men are born free and equal – and that every subject is entitled to liberty, and to have it guarded by the laws, as well as life and property – and in short is totally repugnant to the idea of being born slaves. This being the case, I think the idea of slavery is inconsistent with our own conduct and Constitution; and there can be no such thing as perpetual servitude of a rational creature, unless his liberty is forfeited by some criminal conduct or given up by personal consent or contract ...

Legislators were unable or unwilling to address either slave-owners' concerns about losing their "investment", or white citizens' concerns that if slavery were abolished, freed slaves could become a burden on the community. Some feared that escaped slaves from elsewhere would flood the state.

The Massachusetts Supreme Judicial Court decisions in Walker v. Jennison and Commonwealth v. Jennison established the basis for ending slavery in Massachusetts on constitutional grounds, but no law or amendment to the state constitution was passed. Instead slavery gradually ended "voluntarily" in the state over the next decade. The decisions in the Elizabeth Freeman and Quock Walker trials had removed slavery's legal support and it was said to end by erosion. Some masters manumitted their slaves formally and arranged to pay them wages for continued labor. Other slaves were "freed" but were restricted as indentured servants for extended periods. By 1790, the federal census recorded no slaves in the state.

Family
Quock Walker married Elizabeth Harvey on February 6, 1788, in Barre. He was found to be residing in Barre, Massachusetts, in the 1790 Massachusetts Census but appears to have died before 1810. On December 5, 1792, his sister Minor Walker (1758-1852) married Peter Pitts Peters Sr., who was born in 1758 in Bennington, Vermont. About 1820, Minor, Peter, and their eleven children moved from Barre, Massachusetts to Cambridge, Massachusetts. Several of their children (Walker Lewis, Peter Lewis Jr. and Andress Lewis) moved to the newly incorporated Town of Lowell, Massachusetts where they married, raised their families, lived, and worked for many years.

See also
 Elizabeth Freeman, also known as "Mum Bett", a slave who won her freedom in county court in 1781, and whose case was cited as a precedent in Walker v. Jennison
 Walker Lewis, Quock Walker's nephew, who was ordained as one of the first African-American Mormon Elders
 American slave court cases
 List of slaves

References

External links
 "Quock Walker Case", Africans in America, PBS-WGBH
 Martha Mayo, "Profiles in Courage: African Americans in Lowell", Center for Lowell History, University of Massachusetts Lowell

1753 births
Abolitionism in the United States
United States slavery case law
Freedom suits in the United States
American people of Akan descent
American people of Ghanaian descent
18th-century American slaves
People from Worcester County, Massachusetts
Race legislation in the United States
Year of death missing
People of colonial Massachusetts